Nicolas Schmitt (born  3 October 1936) is a Luxembourgian footballer. He played in 18 matches for the Luxembourg national football team from 1960 to 1965.

References

External links
 

1936 births
Living people
Luxembourgian footballers
Luxembourg international footballers
Place of birth missing (living people)
Association footballers not categorized by position